Urechidicola is a Gram-negative, aerobic, rod-shaped and non-motile genus of bacteria from the family of Flavobacteriaceae with one known species (Urechidicola croceus). Urechidicola croceus has been isolated from the marine spoon worm Urechis unicinctus.

References

Flavobacteria
Bacteria genera
Monotypic bacteria genera
Taxa described in 2020